Aksungur is a Turkish word for gyrfalcon. It may refer to:

History 

 Turkish name used for the Ahmadilis.

People
Aq Sunqur al-Hajib, Seljuk governor of Aleppo

Places
 Aksungur, Çorum, Turkey
Aksungur, Merzifon, a village in Merzifon district of Amasya Province, Turkey
 Aksungur, Osmangazi, Turkey
Lütfullah Aksungur Sports Hall, indoor arena for handball competitions in Adana, Turkey

Other uses
TAI Aksungur, an unmanned aerial vehicle (UAV) in development by the Turkish Aerospace Industries (TAI)